Carex phacota, the lentoid sedge, is a species of flowering plant in the family Cyperaceae. It is native to parts of the Indian Subcontinent, Southeast Asia, most of Malesia, New Guinea, central and southern China, Hainan, Taiwan, Korea, the Ryukyus, and Japan. A pioneer species adapted to disturbances such as fire and landslides, it is typically found in wet grasslands, ditches, the banks of streams, and the sides of roads, and is categorized by the IUCN as Least Concern.

Notes

References

phacota
Flora of India (region)
Flora of East Himalaya
Flora of Nepal
Flora of Sri Lanka
Flora of Indo-China
Flora of Malesia
Flora of New Guinea
Flora of North-Central China
Flora of South-Central China
Flora of Southeast China
Flora of Hainan
Flora of Eastern Asia
Plants described in 1826